Tumor antigen is an antigenic substance produced in tumor cells, i.e., it triggers an immune response in the host. Tumor antigens are useful tumor markers in identifying tumor cells with diagnostic tests and are potential candidates for use in cancer therapy. The field of cancer immunology studies such topics.

Mechanism of tumor antigenesis

Normal proteins in the body are not antigenic because of self-tolerance, a process in which self-reacting cytotoxic T lymphocytes (CTLs) and autoantibody-producing B lymphocytes are culled "centrally" in primary lymphatic tissue (BM) and "peripherally" in secondary lymphatic tissue (mostly thymus for T-cells and spleen/lymph nodes for B cells). Thus any protein that is not exposed to the immune system triggers an immune response. This may include normal proteins that are well sequestered from the immune system, proteins that are normally produced in extremely small quantities, proteins that are normally produced only in certain stages of development, or proteins whose structure is modified due to mutation.

Classification of tumor antigens 

Initially tumor antigens were broadly classified into two categories based on their pattern of expression: Tumor-Specific Antigens (TSA), which are present only on tumor cells and not on any other cell and Tumor-Associated Antigens (TAA), which are present on some tumor cells and also some normal cells.

This classification, however, is imperfect because many antigens thought to be tumor-specific turned out to be expressed on some normal cells as well. The modern classification of tumor antigens is based on their molecular structure and source.

Accordingly, they can be classified as;

 Products of Mutated Oncogenes and Tumor Suppressor Genes 
Products of Other Mutated Genes
 Overexpressed or Aberrantly Expressed Cellular Proteins
 Tumor Antigens Produced by Oncogenic Viruses
 Oncofetal Antigens
 Altered Cell Surface Glycolipids and Glycoproteins
 Cell Type-Specific Differentiation Antigens

Types 
Any protein produced in a tumor cell that has an abnormal structure due to mutation can act as a tumor antigen. Such abnormal proteins are produced due to mutation of the concerned gene. Mutation of protooncogenes and tumor suppressors which lead to abnormal protein production are the cause of the tumor and thus such abnormal proteins are called tumor-specific antigens. Examples of tumor-specific antigens include the abnormal products of ras and p53 genes. In contrast, mutation of other genes unrelated to the tumor formation may lead to synthesis of abnormal proteins which are called tumor-associated antigens.

Other examples include tissue differentiation antigens, mutant protein antigens, oncogenic viral antigens, cancer-testis antigens and vascular or stromal specific antigens. Tissue differentiation antigens are those that are specific to a certain type of tissue.  Mutant protein antigens are likely to be much more specific to cancer cells because normal cells shouldn't contain these proteins. Normal cells will display the normal protein antigen on their MHC molecules, whereas cancer cells will display the mutant version.  Some viral proteins are implicated in forming cancer (oncogenesis), and some viral antigens are also cancer antigens. Cancer-testis antigens are antigens expressed primarily in the germ cells of the testes, but also in fetal ovaries and the trophoblast. Some cancer cells aberrantly express these proteins and therefore present these antigens, allowing attack by T-cells specific to these antigens. Example antigens of this type are CTAG1B and MAGEA1.

Proteins that are normally produced in very low quantities but whose production is dramatically increased in tumor cells, trigger an immune response. An example of such a protein is the enzyme tyrosinase, which is required for melanin production. Normally tyrosinase is produced in minute quantities but its levels are very much elevated in melanoma cells.

Oncofetal antigens are another important class of tumor antigens. Examples are alphafetoprotein (AFP) and carcinoembryonic antigen (CEA). These proteins are normally produced in the early stages of embryonic development and disappear by the time the immune system is fully developed. Thus self-tolerance does not develop against these antigens.

Abnormal proteins are also produced by cells infected with oncoviruses, e.g. EBV and HPV. Cells infected by these viruses contain latent viral DNA which is transcribed and the resulting protein produces an immune response.

In addition to proteins, other substances like cell surface glycolipids and glycoproteins may also have an abnormal structure in tumor cells and could thus be targets of the immune system.

Importance of tumor antigens 

Tumor antigens, because of their relative abundance in tumor cells are useful in identifying specific tumor cells. Certain tumors have certain tumor antigens in abundance.

Certain tumor antigens are thus used as tumor markers. More importantly, tumor antigens can be used in cancer therapy as tumor antigen vaccines.

See also 
 Cancer immunotherapy

References 

 Kumar, Abbas, Fausto; Robbins and Cotran: Pathologic Basis of Disease; Elsevier, 7th ed.
 Coulie PG, Hanagiri T, Takanoyama M: From Tumor Antigens to Immunotherapy. Int J Clin Oncol 6:163, 2001.

External links 
 Chapter on tumor antigens in Cancer Medicine at NCBI

Oncology
Tumor markers